Saint Julian of Sora was a martyr of Sora, Lazio, Italy. A Dalmatian by birth, he was tortured and subsequently beheaded by Roman soldiers in Sora on his way to Campania during the reign of Emperor Antoninus Pius. He is commemorated by the Roman Catholic Church on January 27 and by the Eastern Orthodox Church on July 28 (Old Style) or on August 11 (New Style). his feast day is 27th of January

References

Italian saints
2nd-century Christian martyrs
150 deaths
Year of birth unknown